Emanuel Sperner (9 December 1905 – 31 January 1980) was a German mathematician, best known for two theorems. He was born in Waltdorf (near Neiße, Upper Silesia, now Nysa, Poland), and died in Sulzburg-Laufen, West Germany. He was a student at Carolinum in Nysa and then Hamburg University where his advisor was Wilhelm Blaschke. He was appointed Professor in Königsberg in 1934, and subsequently held posts in a number of universities until 1974.

Sperner's theorem, from 1928, says that the size of an antichain in the power set of an n-set (a Sperner family) is at most the middle binomial coefficient(s). It has several proofs and numerous generalizations, including the Sperner property of a partially ordered set.

Sperner's lemma, from 1928, states that every Sperner coloring of a triangulation of an n-dimensional simplex contains a cell colored with a complete set of colors. It was proven by Sperner to provide an alternate proof of a theorem of Lebesgue characterizing dimensionality of Euclidean spaces.  It was later noticed that this lemma provides a direct proof of the Brouwer fixed-point theorem without explicit use of homology.

Sperner's students included Kurt Leichtweiss and Gerhard Ringel.

References

External links 
 Sperner's photos – from the Mathematical Research Institute of Oberwolfach

1905 births
1980 deaths
People from Nysa County
People from the Province of Silesia
20th-century German mathematicians
Combinatorialists
Kolegium Carolinum Neisse alumni
University of Freiburg alumni
Academic staff of the University of Freiburg
University of Hamburg alumni
Academic staff of the University of Hamburg
Academic staff of the University of Königsberg
Academic staff of the University of Strasbourg
Academic staff of the University of Bonn